MCTV is an acronym used to represent these unrelated television stations:

 Mid-Canada Communications (MCTV), a Canadian system of television stations in northern Ontario, which existed from 1980 to 2005, affiliated with CTV and CBC on separate channels
 Multi-Choice TV (Barbados), cable television service of the Caribbean Broadcasting Corporation
 MCTV 26, a cable television station owned and operated by Mercer County Community College in West Windsor, New Jersey, United States
 MCTV 29, the on-campus television station for Marist College in Poughkeepsie, New York, United States

MCTV may also refer to a number of cable Public-access television cable TV channels in these communities:

Australia
Mandurah, Western Australia
United States
Tempe, Arizona
Millbrae, California
Mount Shasta, California
San Mateo, California
Martin County, Florida
Magoffin County, Kentucky
Turners Falls, Massachusetts
Midland, Michigan
Manchester, New Hampshire
Gresham, Oregon
Allentown, Pennsylvania